Mukut Bihari is an Indian politician and member of the Bharatiya Janata Party. Bihari is a member of the Uttar Pradesh Legislative Assembly from the Kaiserganj (Assembly constituency) in Bahraich district.

References 

People from Bahraich district
Bharatiya Janata Party politicians from Uttar Pradesh
Living people
Yogi ministry
Uttar Pradesh MLAs 2017–2022
State cabinet ministers of Uttar Pradesh
Place of birth missing (living people)
1945 births